Zorin may refer to:

People
 Andrei Zorin (born 1997), Russian footballer
 Leonid Zorin, (1924–2020), Russian playwright
 Sergey Zorin (1891–1937), Soviet politician
 Simcha Zorin (1902–1974), Soviet Jewish partisan in World War II
 Valentin Zorin (1925–2016), Russian author
 Valerian Zorin (1902–1986), Soviet diplomat
 Yuriy Zorin (born 1947), Russian athlete

Other uses
 Max Zorin, a fictional James Bond character
 Zorin Blitz, a fictional Nazi vampire from Hellsing, a manga by Kouta Hirano
 Zorin OS, a Linux distribution based on Ubuntu

See also
 Vera Zorina (1917–2003), Norwegian ballerina and actress
 Zorino, Astrakhan Oblast